Nguyễn Tài Lương, known by the name Linh Chi (1921 – 1 March 2016) was a Vietnamese artist. He specialised in silk paintings and used the theme of Vietnam's ethnic minorities in many of his works. Linh Chi died on 1 March 2016.

References

1921 births
2016 deaths
20th-century Vietnamese painters